The University of the Philippines Manila College of Medicine (CM) is the medical school of the University of the Philippines Manila, the oldest constituent university of the University of the Philippines System. Its establishment in 1905 antedates the foundation of the UP System and makes it one of the oldest medical schools in the country. The Philippine General Hospital, the national university hospital, serves as its teaching hospital.

During World War II it is said that the College of Medicine was the only unit of the University of the Philippines System that continued its operations. Thus the Dean of the college then concurrently served as the President of the system.

History

The Philippine Medical School was built in 1905 at the former Malecon Drive (now Bonifacio Drive). In 1910, it was integrated as one of the colleges into the University of the Philippines and was renamed to U.P. College of Medicine and Surgery. The name was later shortened to the University of the Philippines College of Medicine. Its first Dean was Dr. Paul Freer, while Dr. Fernando Calderon, an alumnus of the University of Santo Tomas Faculty of Medicine and Surgery, became the first Filipino Dean of the college.

The Fernando Calderon Hall is the main building of UP College of Medicine students. Named after the first Filipino dean of the college, the building was transferred from Bonifacio Drive to its current location in Pedro Gil Street, Manila in 1910.

The Calderon Hall and the University of the Philippines College of Medicine was the only UP unit that was open and functional during the height of the Second World War, to provide medical services needed during that time. After the War, the building was rehabilitated in 1951 under the leadership of Dr. Agerico Sison.

The University of the Philippines Health Sciences Center was established in 1967. The center was established by law to provide training and research in the various health sciences. It became an autonomous member of the University of the Philippines System in 1979. The center was further renamed University of the Philippines Manila in 1982. In 1983, U.P. Manila was reorganized to conform to the other autonomous universities of the U.P. System.

The U.P. College of Medicine is one of nine resident degree-granting units of the University of the Philippines Manila.

Performance

The college is proclaimed as a "Center of Excellence" in the field of Medical Education by the Commission on Higher Education.
It has produced several topnotchers in the National Licensure Examination (Medical Board Examination) for Filipino physicians.

Academic programs

The college offers the following academic degree programs:

Undergraduate program
Bachelor of Science in Basic Medical Sciences (for direct entrants of the Integrated Liberal Arts and Medicine Program)
Professional program
Doctor of Medicine
Graduate programs
Master in Orthopedics
Master in Clinical Audiology
Master of Science in Basic Medical Sciences
Master of Science in Biochemistry
Master of Science in epidemiology (Clinical Epidemiology)
Master of Science in Clinical Medicine
Major in Child Health
Major in Family and Community Health
Major in Medical Oncology
Major in Obstetrics and Gynecology
Major in Surgery
Master of Science in Pharmacology
Master in Science in Physiology
Master of Science in Health Informatics (Medical Informatics track) (in partnership with College of Arts and Sciences)
Doctor of Philosophy in Biochemistry
MD-PhD in Molecular Medicine

The college holds postgraduate courses, medical conferences, and training workshops for medical professionals and health workers.

Admission and Curriculum
The U.P. College of Medicine has a seven-year medical curriculum, the Integrated Liberal Arts and Medicine (INTARMED) Program, ultimately leading to the degree of doctor of medicine (M.D.). Its medicine proper (Learning Units III to VII) is designed with an Organ Systems Integration (OSI) curriculum beginning in 2009.

There are two entry points to the College of Medicine: "Learning Unit I" after earning a high school diploma, and "Learning Unit III" (First Year Medicine Proper) after obtaining a baccalaureate degree. Effective school year 2009–2010, all applicants are required to sign a Return Service Agreement.

Learning Unit I
High school graduates who have met the requirements for admission to the University of the Philippines System are eligible for admission to "LU I". Applications are coursed through the University of the Philippines System General Admission Process. The "LU I Intarmed" students are selected from the top 50 male and top 50 female college freshmen qualifiers (ranked according to their University Predicted Grade (UPG) who indicated in the U.P. College Admission Test (UPCAT) application form their interest in Intarmed. Only 40 applicants/Direct Entrants (20 males and 20 females) will finally be admitted into the program following a selection process which includes an interview.

Learning Unit III (First Year Medicine Proper)
Only applicants who have obtained their baccalaureate degree (Bachelor in Science or Arts) by the end of a Philippine school year are eligible. The applicant must have a valid National Medical Admission Test (NMAT) score not lower than 90 percentile. The applicants would then be trimmed down by a rigorous selection process to the final 120 Lateral Entrants for LU III.

Due to the program's two entry points, Direct Entrants are joined by the Lateral Entrants as both groups enter LU III. This results in one class of about 160 students in medicine proper.

Facilities

The college draws support from the Philippine General Hospital, the largest public hospital in the Philippines.

The college enjoys allied faculty and resource support from the other resident colleges in the University of the Philippines Manila, such as:
The U.P. College of Allied Medical Professions (CAMP)
The U.P. College of Dentistry (CD)
The U.P. College of Nursing (CN, a Center of Excellence in Nursing Education)
The U.P. College of Pharmacy (CO)
The U.P. College of Public Health (CPH)
The National Training Center for the Health Professions (NTTC-HP)

The college is also affiliated with the National Institutes of Health comprising eight independent units:
Institute of Biotechnology and Molecular Biology
Institute of Ophthalmology
Institute of Human Genetics
Institute of Clinical Epidemiology
Health Policy and Development Studies
Institute of Child Health and Human Development
Institute of Pharmaceutical Sciences
Ear Institute

Notable alumni
Juan Flavier – Former Philippine Senator and Secretary of Department of Health
Esperanza Cabral – Former Philippine Secretary of Health; former Philippine Secretary of Social Welfare and Development
Enrique Ona – Former Philippine Secretary of Health; former executive director of the National Kidney and Transplant Institute
Alfredo R.A. Bengzon – Dean of the Ateneo School of Medicine and Public Health; chief executive officer of The Medical City
Fe del Mundo – First female student admitted at Harvard University Medical School; founded and owned the 1st private pediatric hospital in the Philippines 
Severina Luna de Orosa – One of the earliest female physicians in the Philippines.
Paulo Campos – National Scientist; pioneer of Nuclear Medicine in the Philippines
Alberto Romualdez – Former Philippine Secretary of Health; Former Director of Research Institute for Tropical Medicine

See also
Philippine General Hospital
University of the Philippines Manila
University of the Philippines

References

External links
University of the Philippines College of Medicine
University of the Philippines Manila
University of the Philippines System

University of the Philippines
Medicine
Schools of public health
Medical schools in the Philippines
Graduate schools in the Philippines